Statistics of the Yemeni League in the 1993-94 season.

Results

Relegated
 Al-Shaab Ibb
 Al-Ahly Taizz
 Al Sha'ab Sana'a
 Al-Yarmuk Sana'a

Other participants
Al-Wahda Sanaa
Al-Zohra Sanaa
Shamsan Aden
Al-Tilal Aden
Al-Shula Aden
Al-Shurta Aden
Al-Sha'ab Hadramaut

External links
 

Yem
Yemeni League seasons
football
football